WMNN-LD (channel 26) is a low-power television station licensed to Lake City, Michigan, United States, serving the Cadillac–Traverse City area as the East Coast flagship of the 24/7 headline news service NewsNet. It is owned and operated by Bridge Media Networks alongside dual MyNetworkTV/Cozi TV affiliate WXII-LD (channel 12). Both stations share studios on West 13th Street in Cadillac, while WMNN-LD's transmitter is located off M-55 east of the city.

Programming

NewsNet Northern Michigan (26.1)

WMNN's primary channel features a newswheel format, similar to what CNN Headline News initially used. The primary channel's format helped form the basis of NewsNet.

On weekdays, the station's rolling news programming is divided into five separate titles: NewsNet Mornings (morning news), Midday Edition (early and mid afternoon news), Continuing Coverage (late afternoon news), Evening Edition (early evening and prime time news), and Nightside Edition (overnight news). Meanwhile, weekend news coverage is branded as Weekend Edition.

In May 2016, the station reformatted, getting rid of pre-recorded anchors. The news wheel now features an eight-minute segment of news updated twice every day.

On December 9, 2019, coinciding with the new look of the national NewsNet service and a new studio, MI News 26 was rebranded as NewsNet Northern Michigan.

On September 14, 2021, an uninterrupted national feed of the NewsNet service, absent of any locally-produced content, was added to the second subchannel of co-owned WXII-LD, coinciding with the launch of that station's digital operations. Programming on WXII-LD2 is very similar to WMNN-LD1, except that it airs the national feed of NewsNet instead of the locally-produced NewsNet Northern Michigan feed.

On January 13, 2022, Freelancer Television Broadcasting's portfolio, including NewsNet, WMNN-LD, and WXII-LD, were sold to investor Manoj Bhargava, with Eric Wotila retaining 10% ownership in the new company Bridge News, LLC. Under the terms of the deal, Bridge News would operate the stations via a time brokerage agreement with Freelancer Television Broadcasting. The sale was consummated on March 24.

Live news coverage
NewsNet Northern Michigan does not offer regular live programming. The station does conduct live broadcasts, most notably during election nights, and commercial-free coverage of the Cherry-T Ball Drop in Traverse City on New Year's Eve.

During severe weather, the station broadcasts live cut-ins if necessary. Pre-taped weather segments sometimes alert viewers to monitor the news ticker at the bottom of the screen or to check the station's website for information.

Non-news programming
Syndicated programs broadcast by WMNN-LD  include Business First with Angela Miles, Daily Flash, and Dish Nation.

TV 26 (26.2)
Originally 26 TV Classics, TV 26 features classic TV shows like Bonanza, The Lone Ranger, Jack Benny, classic cartoons and more. This channel also features syndicated programs Family Feud and The Wendy Williams Show. On March 9, 2015, WMNN became an Antenna TV affiliate.

Laff 26 (26.3)
Cinema 26 featured a selection of "classic movies" and independent films. From August 23, 2011 to January 1, 2012, Cinema 26 was replaced by Universal Sports. This subchannel reverted to Cinema 26 on January 1, 2012 when Universal Sports became a cable and satellite-only channel. Cinema 26 was replaced again, this time by Laff on January 4, 2016.

Mi TV 12 Simulcast (26.5)
Despite having a digital signal of its own, WXII-LD is only 1.5 kW whereas WMNN-LD is 15 kW, so WXII-LD is simulcast over WMNN-LD's twelfth digital subchannel (UHF channel 17.5 or virtual channel 26.5) to expand its over-the-air reach to the entire market.

Subchannels
The station's digital signal is multiplexed:

References

External links

NewsNet affiliates
Start TV affiliates
Ion Mystery affiliates
TheGrio affiliates
Buzzr affiliates
Court TV affiliates
This TV affiliates
Antenna TV affiliates
MNN-LD
Television channels and stations established in 2011
Low-power television stations in the United States